The Our Lady of the Pillar Parish Church, also known as the San Simon Church, is a 19th-century Baroque church located at Barangay San Juan, San Simon, Pampanga, Philippines. The parish church, under the protection of its patron saints, the Virgin of the Pillar and Saint Peter, is under the Roman Catholic Archdiocese of San Fernando.

History and Architecture
The convent of San Simon was established by the Augustinians on April 20, 1771, and was placed under the patronage of Apostle Simon Peter. The town was formerly named after its secondary patron, Our Lady of the Pillar, and was purportedly named after its founder Mariano del Pilar de los Reyes. It was later renamed San Simon by Governor-General Simon de Anda y Salazar who named the town from his namesake upon the recommendation of his close allies, the Augustinian Friars. Governor-General Anda moved the capital of the colony to Pampanga a few years before the founding of the town due to the 1762 British Invasion. Not much historical records are available regarding the construction of the current church other than that a stone edifice was constructed by Father Benito Ubierna in 1870. A certain Father Bernabe built the convent in 1889. Both structures were razed by fire by Filipino revolutionaries on May 5, 1898. Much of the stone walls of the church are intact while the façade and bell tower has been remodeled. The façade sports a triangular pediment, three triple-arched windows on its second level and a concrete porte-cochere. To its left stands the rectangular belfry topped with a pagoda-like canopy.

Image Gallery

References

Roman Catholic churches in Pampanga
Baroque architecture in the Philippines
Spanish Colonial architecture in the Philippines
Churches in the Roman Catholic Archdiocese of San Fernando